Polchlopek (Półchłopek in Polish) is a surname. Notable people with the surname include:

 Edmond Polchlopek (1934–2004), French road racing cyclist and bicycle designer
 Mike Polchlopek (born 1965), American wrestler

See also
 

Polish-language surnames